Yes Sir I Can Boogie is a compilation album by Spanish duo Baccara released in Germany on label BMG-Ariola in 1994.

This compilation includes recordings by the original formation of the duo, Mayte Mateos and María Mendiola, taken from their RCA-Victor studio albums Baccara (1977), Light My Fire (1978) and the greatest hits collection The Hits Of Baccara (1978).

The track listing is identical to 1991's Star Collection.

Track listing

 "Yes Sir, I Can Boogie"  (Dostal - Soja)  - 4:33
 "The Devil Sent You To Lorado"  (Dostal - Soja)  - 4:07 
 "Cara Mia"  (Docker - Soja)  - 2:59
 "Parlez-Vous Français" (English version) (Soja - Dostal - Zentner)  - 4:25  
 "Number One"  (Soja - Dostal)  - 2:37 
 "Yummy Yummy Yummy"  (Levine - Resnick)  - 4:25
 "Sorry, I'm A Lady"  (Dostal - Soja)  - 3:39
 "Granada"  (Lara)  - 4:21 
 "Baby, Why Don't You Reach Out?" / "Light My Fire"  (Edited version) (Soja - Dostal) / (Densmore - Krieger -  Manzarek - Morrison)  - 4:46
 "La Bamba"  (Traditional)  - 3:04 
 "Koochie-Koo"  (Dostal - Soja)  - 4:04  
 "Adelita"  (Traditional)  - 2:31 
 "Somewhere in Paradise"  (Soja - Zentner)  - 4:12 
 "Darling"  (7" version) (Dostal - Soja)  - 5:28
 "Gimme More"  (Soja - Zentner) - 3:50
 "Can't Help Falling In Love" (Creatore - Peretti - Weiss) - 3:26

Personnel
 Mayte Mateos – vocals
 María Mendiola – vocals

Production
 Produced and arranged by Rolf Soja.

Track annotations
 Tracks 1, 3, 5, 7, 8, 11, 15 & 16 from 1977 studio album Baccara.
 Tracks 2 & 13 from 1978 compilation The Hits Of Baccara.
 Track 4 from 1978 7" single "Parlez-Vous Français? (English version)". Original French version appears on album Light My Fire.
 Tracks 6, 10 & 12 from 1978 studio album Light My Fire.
 Track 9 edited version taken from 1978 compilation The Hits Of Baccara. Full-length version appears on album Light My Fire.
 Track 14 from 1978 7" single "Darling". Full-length version appears on album Light My Fire.

References

Baccara albums
1994 compilation albums
Bertelsmann Music Group compilation albums